The Katherine Anne Porter House is a historic house located in Kyle, Texas.  It was built in 1890 and added to the National Register of Historic Places in 2004.  The house is the childhood home of writer Katherine Anne Porter.  It was restored and turned into a short-lived museum at the instigation of Tom Grimes, then-director of the Texas State University MFA program.

The house is now home to the Katherine Anne Porter Literary Center, which hosts readings from the Porter collections at the Wittliff collections, located on the seventh floor of the Albert B. Alkek Library at Texas State University.

The Center is open to visitors by appointment.

See also

National Register of Historic Places listings in Hays County, Texas

References

Houses on the National Register of Historic Places in Texas
Houses completed in 1890
Houses in Hays County, Texas
Tourist attractions in Hays County, Texas
Literary museums in the United States
National Register of Historic Places in Hays County, Texas